Narcolepsy is a neurological condition most characterized by Excessive Daytime Sleepiness (EDS).

Narcolepsy may also refer to:

"Narcolepsy" (Third Eye Blind song), a song by Third Eye Blind from their 1997 album Third Eye Blind
"Narcolepsy" (Ben Folds Five song)", a song by Ben Folds Five from their 1999 album The Unauthorized Biography of Reinhold Messner

See also
"Narcoleptic", a song by Placebo from their 2000 album Black Market Music